The Ambassador Extraordinary and Plenipotentiary of the Russian Federation to the Kingdom of Bahrain is the official representative of the President and the Government of the Russian Federation to the King and the Government of Bahrain.

The ambassador and his staff work at large in the Embassy of Russia in Manama.

History of diplomatic relations

Diplomatic relations at the mission level between the Soviet Union and Bahrain were first established on 29 September 1990. The first Soviet ambassador was appointed in April 1991, and presented his credentials on 30 July 1991.

List of representatives (1990 – present)

Representatives of the Soviet Union to the Kingdom of Bahrain (1990 – 1991)

Representatives of the Russian Federation to the Kingdom of Bahrain (1991 – present)

References

External links

 
Bahrain
Russia